The 1961 Walker Cup, the 18th Walker Cup Match, was played on September 1 and 2, 1961, at Seattle Golf Club, Seattle, Washington. The United States won by 11 matches to 1. This was the last Walker Cup in which 36-hole matches were played.

Great Britain and Ireland's only success came when Martin Christmas beat Charlie Smith in the singles.

Format
Four 36-hole matches of foursomes were played on Friday and eight singles matches on Saturday. Each of the 12 matches was worth one point in the larger team competition. If a match was all square after the 36th hole extra holes were not played. The team with most points won the competition. If the two teams were tied, the previous winner would retain the trophy.

Teams
Ten players for the United States and Great Britain & Ireland participated in the event plus one non-playing captain for each team.

United States

Captain: Jack Westland
Gene Andrews
Deane Beman
Don Cherry
Bob Cochran
Charles Coe
Robert W. Gardner
Bill Hyndman
Jack Nicklaus
Charlie Smith
Bud Taylor

Great Britain & Ireland
 & 
Captain:  Charles Lawrie
 David Blair
 Michael Bonallack
 Joe Carr
 Brian Chapman
 Martin Christmas
 David Frame
 Gordon Huddy
 Michael Lunt
 Ronnie Shade
 James Walker

Friday's foursomes

Saturday's singles

References

Walker Cup
Golf in Washington (state)
Walker Cup
Walker Cup
Walker Cup